= Mathew Gibson =

English antiquarian

- Died: 1741?
- Occupation: Antiquarian

Mathew Gibson (died 1741?) was an English antiquarian.

== Biography ==
Gibson was educated at Queen's College, Oxford, where he graduated B.A. on 9 December 1700 and M.A. on 26 June 1703. At an early date he made the acquaintance of Thomas Hearne, and corresponded with him. An entertaining letter from him to Hearne appears in ‘Letters from the Bodleian Library,’ 1813, i. 197. It is dated from ‘Lord Scudamore's, near Hereford,’ 19 November 1709. Hearne wrote in his diary in April 1734: ‘Mr. Mathew Gibson, rector of Abbey Dore, called on me. He said that he knew Mr. Kyrle (the “Man of Ross”) well, and that he was his wife's near relation—I think her uncle. He said that Kyrle did a great deal of good, but 'twas all out of vanity and ostentation. I know not what credit to give to Mr. Gibson on this account, especially since he hath more than once spoken against that good worthy man, Dr. Ottley, late bishop of St. David's. Besides, this Gibson is a crazed man, and withal stingy, though he is rich, and hath no child by his wife’ (Reliq. Hearnianæ, iii. 132). He was instituted to the living of Abbey Dore on 27 Nov. 1722. His successor, the Rev. Digby Coates, was instituted on 21 July 1741, ‘on vacancy caused by death of the last incumbent’ (Diocesan Register). He wrote ‘A View of the Ancient and Present State of the Churches of Door, Home-Lacy, and Hempsted, endowed by John, lord viscount Scudamore, with some memoirs of that Ancient Family, and an appendix of records and letters,’ London, 1727, a handsome quarto, of which there are two copies in the British Museum Library.
